David 'Dave' R Watkins (born 1945), was a male former cyclist who competed for England.

Cycling career
Watkins represented England at international level during the 1960s and won the gold medal in the junior sprint at the 1963 British National Road Race Championships. He finished on the podium at three further National Championships.

He was selected for England in the scratch race and match sprint event, at the 1966 British Empire and Commonwealth Games in Kingston, Jamaica.

He was a member of the Castle Bromwich and Wyndham Cycling Clubs before turning professional and joining the Harry Quinn Galli team and later the United States Grab on team.

References

1945 births
English male cyclists
Cyclists at the 1966 British Empire and Commonwealth Games
Living people
Commonwealth Games competitors for England